The Ovalia Egg Chair was designed by Danish industrial designer Henrik Thor-Larsen and first displayed in 1968. It resembles Eero Aarnio's Ball Chair, but has narrower proportions. It featured in the films Men in Black and Men in Black II.

References

External links 
Chair's official website

Chairs
Products introduced in 1968